The 2022–23 season is the club's ninth season in Indian Super League since its establishment in 2014. In addition to the league, they will also compete in the 2022 Durand Cup and AIFF Super Cup.

Season overview 

On 11 August, NorthEast United announced the signing of Marco Balbul as their manager for the upcoming season.

On 12 August, NorthEast United announced the signing of Paul Groves as their assistant manager for the upcoming season. The Highlanders also appoint Floyd Pinto as Indian assistant manager.

On 13 August, NorthEast United announced the appointment of Niall Clark as their strength and conditioning coach for the upcoming season.

On 14 August, the Highlanders announced the contract extension of goalkeepers Mirshad Michu and Nikhil Deka for the upcoming season.

On 15 August, NorthEast United announced the retention of defenders Gurjinder Kumar, Mashoor Shereef, Joe Zoherliana and Provat Lakra for the upcoming season.

On 16 August, NorthEast United announced the retention of midfielders Imran Khan, Pragyan Medhi, Mohammed Irshad, Emanuel Lalchhanchhuaha, Pragyan Gogoi and forwards Rochharzela, Laldanmawia Ralte, Gani Nigam for the upcoming season.

On 17 August, NorthEast United lost 0–6 against Odisha FC in their first match of 2022 Durand Cup.

On 18 August, NorthEast United announced the signing of Jithin MS for the upcoming season.

On 20 August, NorthEast United announced the signing of attacking midfielder Emil Benny for the upcoming season.

On 21 August, NorthEast United lost 1–3 against Army Green in their second match of Durand Cup. Dipu Mirdha scored for the Highlanders in the last minute for a late consolation.

On 23 August, NorthEast United confirmed the signing of Arindam Bhattacharya on its social media and various other platforms  for the upcoming season.

On 27 August, NorthEast United lost 0–3 against Kerala Blasters in their 3rd match of Durand Cup.

On 5 September, NorthEast United sign young forward Parthib Sundar Gogoi on a multiyear deal. On this day Highlanders promoted Dipu Mirdha and Alfred Lalroutsang to the first team from reserve team due to their outstanding performance in 2022 Durand Cup.

On 6 September, NorthEast United announced the signing of Spanish midfielder Jon Gaztañaga from Cultural Leonesa for the upcoming season.

Players

Squad

Transfers

IN

Loans In

Out

Loans out

Pre-season and friendlies

Competitions

Overall record

Indian Super League 
This season of the Indian Super League will be played across the country in home and away formats after two seasons of hosting it in Goa due to the COVID-19 pandemic.

League table

League Results by Round

Matches 
The fixtures for the 2022-23 season of ISL were announced on 1 September. NorthEast United were set to face Bengaluru on 8 October.

Durand Cup 

NorthEast United were drawn in the Group D for the 131st edition of the Durand Cup along with two other ISL sides.

Group stage

Matches

Statistics

Squad statistics

|-
!colspan=14 |Goalkeepers

|-
!colspan=14 |Defenders

|-
!colspan=14 |Midfielders

|-
!colspan=14 |Forwards

|-
! colspan=14 style=background:#dcdcdc; text-align:center|Players who left the club during the season

|}

Goalscorers

Assist

Disciplinary record
As of 15 January 2023

Coaching staff

See also 
 List of NorthEast United FC seasons

References 

NorthEast United FC seasons
2022–23 Indian Super League season by team